Arapahoe High School may refer to:

In the United States 
Arapahoe High School (Colorado), Centennial, Colorado
Arapahoe High School (Nebraska), Arapahoe, Nebraska